

Alfons Luczny (4 June 1894 – 12 August 1985) was a German general in the Luftwaffe during World War II. He was a recipient of the Knight's Cross of the Iron Cross of Nazi Germany. Luczny surrendered to the American troops in May 1945, he was handed over to Soviet forces. Convicted as a war criminal in the Soviet Union, he was held until October 1955.

Awards and decorations

 Knight's Cross of the Iron Cross on 9 June 1944 as Generalleutnant and commander of 2. Flak-Division (mot.)

References

Citations

Bibliography

 

1894 births
1985 deaths
People from Kietrz
People from the Province of Silesia
German Army personnel of World War I
Luftwaffe World War II generals
Recipients of the Gold German Cross
Recipients of the Knight's Cross of the Iron Cross
German prisoners of war in World War II held by the Soviet Union
German prisoners of war in World War II held by the United States
Prussian Army personnel
German police officers
Recipients of the clasp to the Iron Cross, 1st class
Lieutenant generals of the Luftwaffe
20th-century Freikorps personnel